Ocrepeira is a genus of orb-weaver spiders first described by George Marx in 1883.

Species
 it contains sixty-seven species:
O. abiseo Levi, 1993 – Peru
O. albopunctata (Taczanowski, 1879) – Peru, Brazil, Guyana, French Guiana
O. anta Levi, 1993 – Colombia
O. aragua Levi, 1993 – Venezuela
O. arturi Levi, 1993 – Panama
O. atuncela Levi, 1993 – Colombia
O. barbara Levi, 1993 – Peru
O. bispinosa (Mello-Leitão, 1945) – Brazil
O. branta Levi, 1993 – Jamaica
O. camaca Levi, 1993 – Brazil
O. comaina Levi, 1993 – Peru
O. covillei Levi, 1993 – Costa Rica, Trinidad to Bolivia
O. cuy Levi, 1993 – Peru
O. darlingtoni (Bryant, 1945) – Hispaniola
O. duocypha (Chamberlin, 1916) – Peru
O. ectypa (Walckenaer, 1841) – USA
O. fiebrigi (Dahl, 1906) – Brazil, Paraguay
O. galianoae Levi, 1993 – Brazil, Argentina
O. georgia (Levi, 1976) – USA
O. gima Levi, 1993 – Brazil
O. globosa (F. O. Pickard-Cambridge, 1904) – USA, Mexico
O. gnomo (Mello-Leitão, 1943) – Brazil
O. gulielmi Levi, 1993 – Colombia, Ecuador
O. heredia Levi, 1993 – Costa Rica
O. herrera Levi, 1993 – Colombia, Ecuador, Peru
O. hirsuta (Mello-Leitão, 1942) – Brazil, Paraguay, Argentina
O. hondura Levi, 1993 – Costa Rica
O. incerta (Bryant, 1936) – Cuba
O. ituango Levi, 1993 – Colombia
O. jacara Levi, 1993 – Brazil
O. jamora Levi, 1993 – Ecuador
O. klossi Levi, 1993 – Brazil
O. lapeza Levi, 1993 – Colombia
O. lisei Levi, 1993 – Brazil
O. lurida (Mello-Leitão, 1943) – Bolivia, Argentina
O. macaiba Levi, 1993 – Brazil
O. macintyrei Levi, 1993 – Ecuador
O. magdalena Levi, 1993 – Colombia
O. malleri Levi, 1993 – Brazil
O. maltana Levi, 1993 – Peru
O. maraca Levi, 1993 – Colombia, Venezuela, Brazil
O. maroni Dierkens, 2014 – French Guiana
O. mastophoroides (Mello-Leitão, 1942) – Argentina
O. molle Levi, 1993 – Bolivia, Argentina
O. pedregal Levi, 1993 – Mexico, Nicaragua
O. pinhal Levi, 1993 – Brazil
O. pista Levi, 1993 – Peru
O. planada Levi, 1993 – Colombia, Ecuador
O. potosi Levi, 1993 – Mexico
O. redempta (Gertsch & Mulaik, 1936) – USA to Honduras
O. redondo Levi, 1993 – Colombia
O. rufa (O. Pickard-Cambridge, 1889) – Mexico to Costa Rica
O. saladito Levi, 1993 – Colombia
O. serrallesi (Bryant, 1947) – Caribbean
O. sorota Levi, 1993 – Bolivia
O. steineri Levi, 1993 – Venezuela
O. subrufa (F. O. Pickard-Cambridge, 1904) – Mexico to Panama
O. tinajillas Levi, 1993 – Colombia, Ecuador
O. tumida (Keyserling, 1865) – Colombia, Ecuador
O. tungurahua Levi, 1993 – Ecuador
O. valderramai Levi, 1993 – Colombia
O. venustula (Keyserling, 1879) – Colombia to Chile
O. verecunda (Keyserling, 1865) – Colombia
O. viejo Levi, 1993 – Costa Rica to Peru
O. willisi Levi, 1993 – Panama
O. yaelae Levi, 1993 – Ecuador
O. yucatan Levi, 1993 – Mexico

References

External links
 Ocrepeira at BugGuide

Araneidae
Araneomorphae genera
Spiders of North America
Spiders of South America